The governor of the Department of Córdoba heads the executive branch of the government of the Córdoba Department in Colombia. The governor is the highest-ranking official in the department and is elected by popular vote. The current governor is Orlando Benítez.

Qualifications 
The elected governor of Córdoba is required to be a citizen of Colombia or be naturalized; to be at least 18 years old; and not hold another political office at the time of the election.

Constitutional authority and responsibilities 
Article 303 of the Colombian Constitution states:

In each one of the departments there will be a Governor who will be head of the sectional administration and legal representative of the department; The Governor will be an agent of the President of the Republic for the maintenance of public order and for the execution of the general economic policy, as well as for those matters that the Nation agrees with the department through agreements.
 Governors will be popularly elected for institutional terms of four (4) years and may not be re-elected for the following term. The law will set the qualities, requirements, disabilities and incompatibilities of the governors; will regulate your choice; it will determine its absolute and temporary faults; and the way to fill out the latter and will dictate the other provisions necessary for the normal performance of their duties.

Whenever there is an absolute absence more than eighteen (18) months before the end of the period, a governor will be elected for the remainder of the time. In the event that there is less than eighteen (18) months to go, the President of the Republic will appoint a Governor for the remainder of the period, respecting the party, political group or coalition by which the elected Governor was registered.

List of governors of Córdoba

See also 

 Governor of Atlántico

References